Tetraulaxini is a tribe of longhorn beetles of the subfamily Lamiinae. It was described by Breuning and Téocchi in 1976.

Taxonomy
 Brachyolene Aurivillius, 1914
 Tetraulax Jordan, 1903

References

 
Lamiinae